The Difference Machine is the fifth studio album by the English progressive rock band Big Big Train. It was released on 30 August 2007, by English Electric Recordings. TDM is a concept album exploring chaos theory, communication, failure, death, loss, and bereavement. The story is of the death of an individual, which was linked to an exploding star in a distant galaxy. There are more influences of Van der Graaf Generator, Genesis, Mew, Sigur Rós and King Crimson throughout the album.

Track listing

Personnel
Sean Filkins - lead vocals (tracks 2, 4, 6-8)
Gregory Spawton - guitars (tracks 1-4, 6-8), keyboards (all tracks), backing vocals (tracks 2, 4)
Andy Poole - bass (tracks 6-8)
Steve Hughes - drums (tracks 7, 8)
Guest musicians
Becca King - viola (tracks 1, 2, 4, 7, 8)
Tony Wright - alto saxophone (tracks 1, 8), tenor saxophone (tracks 2, 4, 6, 8), flute (track 4)
Nick D'Virgilio - drums (tracks 2, 4, 6), backing vocals (track 2)
Dave Meros - bass (track 2)
Pete Trewavas - bass (track 4)

External links
BIG BIG TRAIN The Difference Machine music reviews and MP3 @ progarchives.com

Big Big Train albums
2007 albums